Tine Tollan (born 16 September 1964) is a Norwegian diver. She was born in Tønsberg. She competed at the 1984 Summer Olympics in Los Angeles, in both platform, where she placed 12th, and in springboard.

References

External links

1964 births
Living people
Sportspeople from Tønsberg
Norwegian female divers
Olympic divers of Norway
Divers at the 1984 Summer Olympics